Maplewood is an unincorporated community in Fayette County, West Virginia, United States.

The community was named for a sugar maple tree at the original town site.

References

Unincorporated communities in Fayette County, West Virginia
Unincorporated communities in West Virginia